A shade tree is a large tree whose primary role is to provide shade in the surrounding environment due to its spreading canopy and crown, where it may give shelter from sunlight in the heat of the summer for people who seek recreational needs in urban parks and house yards, and thus, also protecting them from the sun's harmful UV rays and sunburns. Therefore, some shade trees may be grown specifically for the comfort of the population due to their convenient shelter. 

Furthermore, shade trees are also effective in reducing the energy used in cooling homes.

Popular shade trees

Some of the most popular shade trees in temperate countries are oaks, plane trees, willows, birches, beeches, maples, ashes, lindens, and elms. In subtropical countries like Australia and India, figs are popular choices as shade trees. In tropical countries, trees such as some Erythrina and African tulip tree species are often planted as shade trees.

Species
These trees are commonly grown, and/or used, as shade trees due to their protuberant size:

American ash
American elm
American sycamore
Austrian oak
Brush box
Banyan tree 
Black walnut
Blue Jacaranda
Camphor laurel
Cape Chestnut
Carob tree
Chinese elm
Coastal Coral Tree
European beech
Honey locust
Golden Ash
Golden rain tree
Holm oak
Hopea odorata
Hill's weeping fig
Indian horse-chestnut
Japanese elm
London plane
Moreton bay fig
Norway maple
Oriental plane
Palestine oak
Pepper tree
Port Jackson Fig
Red maple
Royal poinciana
Rough-barked apple
Scarlet oak
Scholar tree
Silver linden
Shumard oak
Small-leaved fig
Southern live oak
Swamp Spanish oak
Sweet gum
Sycamore fig
Sycamore maple
Sydney red gum
Tulipwood
White feather honeymyrtle
Yellow box

Planting
There are a few factors to consider when choosing a shade tree: deciduousness, coverage, longevity, and the ability of the roots to damage foundations. Shade trees can enhance the privacy of a garden, patio, or back yard, by obstructing the view of outsiders.  A disadvantage is that in cool climates, an abundance of shade trees may lead to a dank environment in any nearby buildings or gardens. Shade trees must not be planted near chimneys as flying fire sparks can ignite tree branches which could cause rapidly expanding fires.

Planting shade trees around a home can also reduce the energy that homeowners use in the summer months. Planting shade trees in locations near a home air conditioner can keep the air conditioner cooler which helps it run more efficiently, so less energy is used.

See also

Landscaping
Avenue (landscape)

References

Trees
Ornamental trees
Landscape
Landscape ecology
Community ecology
Plant ecology
Habitat

tl:Talisay